The Spanish Fly (German: Die spanische Fliege) is a 1931 German comedy film directed by Georg Jacoby and starring Betty Bird, Lizzi Waldmüller and Fritz Schulz. It was shot at the Halensee Studios in Berlin. It was based on the 1913 play The Spanish Fly by Franz Arnold and Ernst Bach. The film was remade in 1955.

Cast
Betty Bird
Lizzi Waldmüller
Fritz Schulz
Hans Brausewetter
Oscar Sabo
Julia Serda
Lizzi Natzler 
Ralph Arthur Roberts
Paul Westermeier
Hans Hermann Schaufuß
Gertrud Wolle
Paul Biensfeldt
Arthur Mainzer
Henry Bender
Franz Weber
Laurie Lane
Erika Helmke

References

Bibliography
 Klaus, Ulrich J. Deutsche Tonfilme: Jahrgang 1931. Klaus-Archiv, 2006.

External links

1931 comedy films
Films of the Weimar Republic
German comedy films
Films directed by Georg Jacoby
German films based on plays
German black-and-white films
1930s German films
1930s German-language films
Films shot at Halensee Studios